Friedrich Sämisch (20 September 1896 – 16 August 1975) was a German chess player and chess theorist. He was among the inaugural recipients of the title International Grandmaster from FIDE in 1950.

Background

Sämisch was a bookbinder before taking up chess full-time. As a player, he had a reputation for getting into time trouble though somewhat inconsistently he was a fine player of lightning chess. He was also said to be a fine player of blindfold chess, with world champion Alexander Alekhine observing: 'Of all the modern masters that I have had occasion to observe playing blindfold chess, it is Sämisch who interests me the most; his great technique, his speed and precision have always made a profound impression on me'.

Main competitive results
 2nd at Berlin 1920
 1st at Vienna, Austria in 1921 (champion of the first, although unofficial, Austrian Chess Championship), above Max Euwe, Gyula Breyer, Ernst Grünfeld and Savielly Tartakower
 2nd at Hamburg 1921
 equal 2nd with Tartakower, after Aron Nimzowitsch, at Copenhagen 1923
 3rd at Baden-Baden 1925, after Alexander Alekhine and Akiba Rubinstein
 equal 1st with Sir George Thomas at Spa, Belgium, 1926
 1st at Dortmund 1928, above Richard Réti, Paul Johner and Efim Bogoljubov
 equal 1st with Réti at Brünn 1928
 1st at Swinemünde 1930

In 1922 he won a match in Berlin against Réti (+4−1=3).

Perhaps his most famous game is his loss to Nimzowitsch at Copenhagen 1923 in the Immortal Zugzwang Game. He also played many beautiful games though, one of them being his win against Grünfeld at Carlsbad 1929, which won a brilliancy prize. In the same tournament he also won against José Raúl Capablanca. The former world champion lost a piece in the opening but did not resign, which usually happens in such cases in grandmaster games, but to no avail, this disadvantage being too much even for a player of his class.

At the age of 73, in 1969, Sämisch played a tournament in memoriam of Adolf Anderssen in Büsum, Germany, and another tournament in Linköping, Sweden, but lost all games in both events (fifteen in the former and thirteen in the latter) on time control.

Contributions to opening theory

Sämisch is today remembered primarily for his contributions to opening theory. Four major opening lines are named after him:
  a variation of the King's Indian: 1.d4 Nf6 2.c4 g6 3.Nc3 Bg7 4.e4 d6 5.f3
  a variation of the Nimzo-Indian: 1.d4 Nf6 2.c4 e6 3.Nc3 Bb4 4.a3
  a variation of the Queen's Indian: 1.d4 Nf6 2.c4 e6 3.Nf3 b6 4.g3 Bb7 5.Bg2 c5
  a variation of the Alekhine's Defence: 1. e4 Nf6 2. e5 Nd5 3. Nc3

World War II
During this war, Sämisch was appointed as "Betreuer" for the troops, so his task was to give chess demonstrations and play simultaneous exhibitions for German soldiers all over Europe. Upon arrival in Spain in 1944 for a tournament, he proposed to the British ambassador that he would play a simul for the British troops in Gibraltar, but his humorously-meant offer was refused. Then Sämisch criticised Adolf Hitler at the closing banquet of the Madrid tournament in summer 1944. Upon returning to the German border, he was arrested and transported to a concentration camp. This was not his first transgression, since he had previously said loudly in the Luxor coffee house in Prague: 'Isn't Hitler a fool? He thinks he can win the war with Russians!' According to Grandmaster Ludek Pachman: Prague was full of Gestapo, and Sämisch had to be overheard at least at the next few tables. I asked him to speak quietly. 'You don't agree that Hitler is a fool?' was Sämisch's unconcerned retort.

References

External links 
 Fritz Saemisch games at 365Chess.com
 

1896 births
1975 deaths
Chess grandmasters
Chess Olympiad competitors
Chess theoreticians
German chess players
Sportspeople from Berlin
20th-century chess players